Colony Park is a census-designated place in Spring Township, Berks County, Pennsylvania, United States.  It is located just off U.S. 222, approximately one mile northwest of the borough of Wyomissing.  As of the 2010 census, the population was 1,076 residents.

Demographics

References

Census-designated places in Berks County, Pennsylvania
Census-designated places in Pennsylvania